List of British Railways steam locomotives as of 31 December 1967. The following is a list of British Railways steam locomotives as of the end of 1967. With main line steam ending in August 1968, these are the ones that survived to the last year. By this stage, steam locomotive stock had been severely reduced from over 20,000 locomotives at nationalisation to fewer than 370.

Locomotive classes
Of the remaining 359 standard gauge steam locomotives, all were robust, two-cylinder tender engines to seven classes. The vast majority were to two ex-LMS classes designed by William Stanier; 151 ex-LMS Black Fives and 150 ex-LMS 8Fs. The remaining 58 were an assortment of four BR standard classes and one other ex-LMS class. All were based on the London Midland Region. They were employed mostly on freight workings in industrial North-West England. Main line steam would end with the Fifteen Guinea Special on 11 August 1968.

Capital stock

Departmental stock 
Departmental stock was numbered in a different series to the capital stock.

Post-1967 survivals
The locomotives of the Vale of Rheidol Railway, narrow gauge, acquired from the GWR but which had been transferred to the London Midland Region survived the end of main line steam, remaining in BR stock until 1989 when the VoR was privatised and preserved. There were also three ex-LNER Thompson Class B1s in departmental stock used as carriage heaters on the Eastern Region. These latter engines had their couplings removed so they could not haul trains, though they could still propel themselves. These were withdrawn in 1968.

References 
 Pat Rowledge Locomotives of the LMS built 1923-1951
 Hugh Longworth British Railway (sic) Steam Locomotives 1948-68

 
 
British Railways Steam Locomotives As Of 31 December 1967